The Waterstones 11 was a literary book prize aimed at promoting debut authors, run and curated by British bookseller Waterstones.  It ran from 2011–13. The list of 11 authors are selected from a list of 100 authors submitted by publishers. The prize, established in 2011, has included Orange Prize winner Tea Obreht's novel The Tiger's Wife, Man Booker Prize nominee Pigeon English by Stephen Kelman and  the winner of the Desmond Elliott Prize for New Fiction, The Land of Decoration by Grace McCleen.

Winners

2011
The winners were announced on 20 January 2011 

City of Bohane by Kevin Barry
The Free World by David Bezmozgis
The Registrar's Manual for Detecting Forced Marriages by Sophie Hardach
22 Britannia Road by Amanda Hodgkinson
Chinaman: The Legend of Pradeep Mathew by Shehan Karunatilaka
Pigeon English by Stephen Kelman - Shortlisted for 2011 Man Booker Prize 
The Coincidence Engine by Sam Leith
The Tiger's Wife by Tea Obreht - Winner of the 2011 Orange Prize 
The Sentimentalists by Johanna Skibsrud
The Collaborator by Mirza Waheed - Shortlisted for The Guardian First Book Prize 
When God Was a Rabbit by Sarah Winman - Winner of Edinburgh Book Festival Newton First Book Prize

2012
The winners were announced on 20 January 2012 

The Panopticon by Jenni Fagan
Absolution by Patrick Flanery - Longlisted for The Guardian First Book Award 
Shelter by Frances Greenslade
The Art of Fielding by Chad Harbach - Shortlisted for The Guardian First Book Award
The Snow Child by Eowyn Ivey
The Unlikely Pilgrimage of Harold Fry by Rachel Joyce - Longlisted for 2012 Man Booker Prize 
The Land of Decoration by Grace McCleen - Winner of the Desmond Elliott Prize for New Fiction 
Signs of Life by Anna Raverat
The Lifeboat by Charlotte Rogan
The Age of Miracles by Karen Thompson Walker
Care of Wooden Floors by Will Wiles

2013
The winners were announced on 14 January 2013 

Pig's Foot by Carlos Acosta
Idiopathy by Sam Byers
Y by Marjorie Celona
The Universe Versus Alex Woods by Gavin Extence
Burial Rites by Hannah Kent
The Fields by Kevin Maher
The Son by Michel Rostain
The Spinning Heart by Donal Ryan
Marriage Material by Sathnam Sanghera
Ghana Must Go by Taiye Selasi
Ballistics by D. W. Wilson

References

British literary awards
Awards established in 2011
2011 establishments in the United Kingdom
First book awards